Octopicola is a genus of crustaceans belonging to the monotypic family Octopicolidae.

The genus has almost cosmopolitan distribution.

Species:

Octopicola huanghaiensis 
Octopicola regalis 
Octopicola stocki 
Octopicola superba

References

Crustaceans